Xavier Ouellet (born July 29, 1993) is a French-born Canadian professional ice hockey defenceman who is currently playing for Wilkes-Barre/Scranton Penguins in the American Hockey League (AHL) while under contract to the Pittsburgh Penguins of the National Hockey League (NHL). Ouellet was drafted 48th overall by the Detroit Red Wings in the 2011 NHL Entry Draft, and made his NHL debut with the team in 2013. Ouellet was born in Bayonne, France, but grew up in Terrebonne, Quebec.

Playing career
As a youth, Ouellet played in the 2006 Quebec International Pee-Wee Hockey Tournament with a minor ice hockey team from Basses-Laurentides Ouest.

Junior
During the 2009–10 season, in his rookie season, Ouellet played in 43 games for the Montreal Juniors. Ouellet recorded two goals and 14 assists for 16 points. Ouellet recorded three assists in seven playoff games. Ouellet was named to the 2009-10 QMJHL's All-Rookie Team.

During the 2010–11 season, in 67 games for the Juniors, Ouellet recorded eight goals and 35 assists for 43 points. Ouellet recorded eight assists in 10 playoff games. Ouellet played for Team Orr at the 2011 CHL Home Hardware Top Prospects Game.

During the 2011–12 season, Ouellet was named a team captain for Blainville-Boisbriand, after the team re-located from Montreal. Ouellet was the re-christened Armada's second-leading scorer while playing a combative, physical defensive game. In his third QMJHL season he scored 21 goals with 39 assists in 63 games. Ten of his 21 goals were scored on the power play. The Armada finished first in the West Division and advanced to the second round of the playoffs. Ouellet scored three goals and seven assists in 11 playoff games. He was named to the QMJHL's first all-star team.

During the 2012–13 season, Ouellet returned to Blainville-Boisbriand for his fourth QMJHL season. A team captain for the Armada, he scored 10 goals and 31 assists in 50 games. Nine of his 10 goals were scored on the power play. Blainville-Boisbriand finished first in the West Division and reached the Western Conference finals. Ouellet scored seven goals and nine assists in 15 playoff games. Ouellet was rewarded for his outstanding play during the 2012–13 season by being named to the QMJHL's First All-Star Team for the second year in a row.

Professional
On March 25, 2012, the Detroit Red Wings signed Ouellet to a three-year entry level contract.

During the 2013–14 season, in his first professional season with the Grand Rapids Griffins, Ouellet recorded four goals and 13 assists in 70 games. On October 21, 2013, Ouellet made his NHL debut for the Red Wings in a game against the San Jose Sharks.

During the 2014–15 season, Ouellet recorded one goal and 15 assists in 52 games with the Griffins, and was named to the 2015 AHL All-Star Classic. On November 28, 2014, Ouellet scored his first career NHL goal against Cory Schneider of the New Jersey Devils. In 21 games for the Red Wings, Ouellet recorded two goals and one assist.

On November 16, 2015, the Red Wings signed Ouellet to a one-year contract extension.

On December 19, 2015, Ouellet was recalled by the Red Wings. He was returned to the Griffins on December 23. Ouellet was named to the 2016 Toyota AHL All-Star Classic. On February 13, 2016, Ouellet was recalled by the Red Wings. On February 24, Ouellet was assigned to the Griffins. On April 20, Ouellet was recalled by the Red Wings. Prior to being recalled, he recorded four goals and 25 assists in 61 games with the Griffins. He was reassigned to the Griffins on April 21.

During the 2016–17 season, in his first full NHL season, Ouellet recorded three goals and nine assists in 66 games for the Red Wings. On July 3, 2017, the Red Wings signed Ouellet to a two-year contract extension.

In the following 2017–18 season, Ouellet recorded seven assists in 45 games. With his development having stagnated within the Red Wings organization, on June 24, 2018 the Red Wings waived Ouellet for the purpose of a contract buyout on the remaining year of his contract. On July 1, 2018, the Montreal Canadiens signed Ouellet to a one-year, two-way contract. Ouellet spent majority of the 2018–19 season with the Laval Rocket. In 47 games with the Rocket, he scoring seven goals and 21 assists. Ouellet also skated in 19 games with the Canadiens, recording three assists.

On May 27, 2019, the Canadiens re-signed Ouellet to a one-year, two-way contract worth $700,000. On October 9, 2020, the Canadiens re-signed Ouellet to a two-year, two-way contract worth $737,500.

After his fourth season within the Canadiens organization, Ouellet left as a free agent to sign a two-year, two-way contract with the Pittsburgh Penguins on July 13, 2022.

International play
Ouellet played for Team Quebec at the 2010 World U-17 Hockey Challenge, scoring one goal and one assist in five games.

Ouellet represented Canada at the 2013 World Junior Ice Hockey Championships. Ouellet was one of the top defencemen for Canada at the WJC, scoring a power play goal and two assists in six games. Canada was fourth in the tournament, losing to Russia in overtime in the bronze medal game.

Personal life
Ouellet is the son of Robert Ouellet. He married Elizabeth Kranz on January 27, 2018. They had their first child in July 2017.

Career statistics

Regular season and playoffs

International

Awards and honours

References

External links

1993 births
Living people
Blainville-Boisbriand Armada players
Canadian expatriate ice hockey players in the United States
Canadian ice hockey defencemen
Canadian people of French descent
Detroit Red Wings draft picks
Detroit Red Wings players
Grand Rapids Griffins players
Ice hockey people from Quebec
Laval Rocket players
Montreal Canadiens players
Montreal Junior Hockey Club players
Sportspeople from Bayonne
People from Terrebonne, Quebec
Wilkes-Barre/Scranton Penguins players